Bankstown Lidcombe Hospital is teaching hospital with tertiary affiliations to the University of New South Wales, University of Sydney and Western Sydney University providing a wide range of general medical and surgical services and sub-specialty services to the Bankstown/Canterbury community. It is part of South Western Sydney Local Health District.

History
It was built next to the former Bankstown Hospital which opened in 1957, This was later demolished. It became part of the South Western Sydney Local Health District in January 2011 following National Health Reform replacing the former Sydney South West Area Health Service

See also

List of hospitals in Australia

References

External links
South Western Sydney Local Health District website

Hospital buildings completed in 1996
Hospitals in Sydney
Bankstown, New South Wales
Hospitals established in 1996
1996 establishments in Australia